Church Bay may refer to:

 Church Bay, Anglesey, a settlement in Wales
 Church Bay, Bermuda, a snorkelling beach 
 Church Bay, South Georgia, a bay in the southern Atlantic Ocean
 Church Bay, Northern Ireland, the main port of Rathlin Island
 Church Bay, New Zealand a settlement near Lyttletown in South Island New Zealand